Azamat Mukanov (born January 1, 1991) is a Kazakh judoka. He won the silver medal at the 2013 World Judo Championships held in Rio de Janeiro in the -66 kg event. Mukanov is the 2011 national champion of Kazakhstand and ranked third in 2013. He claimed the bronze medal in the World Cup event in Prague 2012 and another bronze medal at the 2013 Asian Championships in Bangkok.

Palmarès
Source:

2011
 Kazakhstan Championships -66 kg, Uralsk
2012
 World Cup -66 kg, Prague
 Kazakhstan Championships -66 kg, Taldykorgan
2013
 World Championships -66 kg, Rio de Janeiro
 Asian Championships -66 kg, Bangkok

References

External links
 

1991 births
Living people
Kazakhstani male judoka
Asian Games medalists in judo
Judoka at the 2014 Asian Games
Asian Games silver medalists for Kazakhstan
Asian Games bronze medalists for Kazakhstan
Medalists at the 2014 Asian Games